The India national cricket team toured Pakistan during the 1978–79 cricket season. They played three Test matches against the Pakistan cricket team, with Pakistan winning the series 2–0. The tour also featured three One Day International (ODI) matches. In the third match, India's captain, Bishen Bedi, conceded the game in protest against Sarfraz Nawaz short-pitched bowling. It was the first time an international cricket match had ended in this way.

Test matches

1st Test

2nd Test

3rd Test

One Day Internationals (ODIs)

1st ODI

2nd ODI

3rd ODI

References

External links
 Tour page CricInfo
 Record CricInfo

1978 in Indian cricket
1978 in Pakistani cricket
1978-79
Pakistani cricket seasons from 1970–71 to 1999–2000
International cricket competitions from 1975–76 to 1980